KDS Group is a business and industrial conglomerates of Bangladesh, which is based in Chittagong but with extensive operations in Dhaka as well. It has also established offices and agencies in India, Hong Kong and is currently expanding into Europe and North America. It is one of the largest private sector employers in Bangladesh.

History 

The group was founded in 1983, through the establishment of one of the first garments industries of Bangladesh. The founder of the group was Khalilur Rahman.

KDS Textiles was established in 2000. The same year, KDS Steel established KYCR Coil Industries Limited. In 2001, the Cold Rolling Mills Complex was established by KDS group.

In February 2008, Rapid Action Battalion recovered Voice over Internet Protocol equipment, illegal in Bangladesh, after raiding an apartment complex in Sugandha Residential Area owned by the chairman of the group, Khalilur Rahman, who denied any involvement.

In March 2009, KDS Logistics began operations of its Inland Container Depot near Chittagong Port. The group had invested three billion BDT to establish the depot. The Group was awarded the national export trophy in 2010 by Prime Minister Sheikh Hasina.

KDS Accessories established a new factory in Gazipur District in September 2016.

In February 2017, Khalilur Rahman, chairman of KDS Group, was elected chairman of AIBL Capital Market Services Limited, a subsidiary of Al-Arafah Islami Bank. It announced plans to invest 10 million USD in the Bangabandhu Hi-Tech City.

The Department of Environment implicated KDS Textile Mills Limited of polluting Halda River in a report of the agency. In November 2019, KDS Accessories approved 15 per cent dividend for stock holders.

In January 2021, Munir Hussain Khan, former director of KYCR Coil Industries and KY Steel, accused KDS Group of harassing him through filing 28 cases against him and his family members. Khan had joined the group in 2007 and left in 2018 following an argument over management of the company. He later joined Apollo Steel after which KDS Group filled cases against him accusing him of embezzling six billion BDT and stealing a car from the company. In August, the managing director of the group, Salim Rahman, was made the chairman of Al-Arafah Islami Bank.

KDS Accessories Limited profit increased 6 per cent in 2022 from 2021. The rising cost of raw materials had reduced the bottom line for the company.

Businesses 

 KDS Textiles
 KDS Garment Industries Limited
 KDS Hi-Tec Garments BD Limited
 KDS Apparels Limited
 KDS Fashion Limited
 HN Garments Limited
 KDS Accessories
 KYCR Coil Industries Limited
 KDS Steel
 KY Steel Mills Limited
 KDS Logistics
 KDS Properties Limited
 National Bank Limited (founding shareholder)
 Al-Arafah Islami Bank Limited (founding shareholder)
 Northern insurance Limited
 Pragati Insurance Limited
 Skys Securities Limited

References

Conglomerate companies of Bangladesh
Manufacturing companies based in Chittagong
Manufacturing companies established in 1983
1983 establishments in Bangladesh